The Man Without a Face is a 1928 American adventure film serial directed by Spencer Gordon Bennet. The film is now considered to be lost.

Cast
 Allene Ray
 Walter Miller 
 E. H. Calvert
 Sōjin Kamiyama
 Gladden James
 Richard Neill (credited as Richard R. Neill)
 Toshia Mori (credited as Toshiye Ichioka)
 Richard Travers (credited as Richard C. Travers)

See also
 List of film serials
 List of film serials by studio

References

External links

1928 films
1928 adventure films
American silent serial films
American black-and-white films
Pathé Exchange film serials
Films directed by Spencer Gordon Bennet
Lost American films
American adventure films
Films based on works by Alice Williamson
1928 lost films
Lost adventure films
1920s American films
Silent adventure films